Werribee Racecourse is a disused station located between Werribee and Little River stations in Werribee, south-west Melbourne, Australia.  The station was provided to serve the nearby Werribee Racecourse.

When line from Newport to Werribee was electrified in the 1980s, Werribee Racecourse station was originally to be part of the system. Overhead stanchions were built along one track as far as the station, but they were never wired. The safeworking system used on the line does not permit a train to terminate and reverse once inside a signalling section, so without modifications to the signalling system, electric trains going to Werribee Racecourse station could not have returned to Werribee.

The station has been unused since 1995 when the Western standard gauge line was built to the west of the platform, making it impossible to get to the station from the racecourse without crossing the standard gauge track. There have been calls to extend the overhead to the station to the serve the growing areas west of Werribee.

References

Disused railway stations in Melbourne
Railway stations closed in 1995
Werribee, Victoria
Railway stations in the City of Wyndham